Ludmila Feodorovna Saunina (born 1952 in Yekaterinburg) is a Russian chess player, and a woman grandmaster.

She has won several women's chess championships: the Russian Chess Championship in 1972, the Moldovan Chess Championship in 1976, the World Senior Chess Championship and the European Senior Chess Championship.

External links
entry

Living people
1952 births
Chess woman grandmasters
Sportspeople from Yekaterinburg
Russian female chess players
Date of birth missing (living people)
20th-century Russian women